Happily Ever After (Translation: They married and had many children) is a 2004 French comedy drama film. The film is written and directed by Yvan Attal, produced by Claude Berri, and starring Charlotte Gainsbourg and Yvan Attal.

It was released in English in North America. For English-speaking audiences, the film is highly recognizable for the lengthy cameo appearance of Johnny Depp, who speaks fluent French.

The soundtrack also features Radiohead.

Plot 

Happily Ever After dissects the viability of fidelity via the story of three buddies and their tumultuous relationships with the opposite sex.

The film opens with the central characters, Vincent (Yvan Attal) and Gabrielle (Charlotte Gainsbourg) capriciously flirting in a bar.  Vincent appears to win the affection of Gabrielle over many other potential courters, but the entire exercise is a ruse; they are actually married with a child.

The rest of the film explores the nature of romance, marriage, happiness, expectations in life, how love and sex interrelate, and ultimately, why no one can feel fulfilled.

Cast
 Charlotte Gainsbourg as Gabrielle
 Yvan Attal as Vincent
 Alain Chabat as Georges
 Emmanuelle Seigner as Nathalie
 Alain Cohen as Frédéric
 Ben Attal as Joseph
 Angie David as the mistress
 Aurore Clément as the mistress's mother
 Anouk Aimée as Vincent's mother
 Claude Berri as Vincent's father
 Nicolas Vaude as The disgruntled viewer
 Johnny Depp as L'inconnu
 Luis Saguar as Casper.

Reception

Review aggregation website Rotten Tomatoes gives the film a 57% approval rating based on 42 reviews, with an average rating of 6.01/10. The site's critics consensus reads: "Though this French film features good acting, it lacks the wit and charm one would expect to see."

References

External links 
  
 
 

2004 films
2004 comedy-drama films
Films directed by Yvan Attal
Films produced by Claude Berri
2000s French-language films
2000s Italian-language films
2000s English-language films
French comedy-drama films
2004 multilingual films
French multilingual films
2000s French films